Rollin V. Wilson Sr. (March 21, 1899 – May 13, 1953) was an American college football player and coach. He served as the head football coach at West Tennessee Normal School—now known as the University of Memphis–in 1921, compiling a record of 4–5–1.

Head coaching record

References

External links
 

1899 births
1953 deaths
American football halfbacks
Memphis Tigers football coaches
Memphis Tigers football players
Tennessee Volunteers football players
Coaches of American football from Tennessee
Players of American football from Memphis, Tennessee